Llanto De Un Héroe ("Cry Of A Hero") is an album by the power metal band Avalanch, and the first one featuring Víctor García as the lead vocals. The lyrics talk about epic themes, such as Rodrigo Díaz de Vivar, Don Pelayo or Tomás de Torquemada the inquisitor, and about Asturian legends like "Cambaral" and ecologist thematic like "Vientos del Sur", dedicated to Jacques-Yves Cousteau.

Track listing 
 All songs by Alberto Rionda, Except 3 and 11 Víctor García

 "Intro" 01:48	
 "Torquemada" 06:26	
 "Por Mi Libertad" ("For My Freedom") 06:06	
 "Pelayo" 07:16	
 "Vientos Del Sur" ("South Winds") 06:54	
 "Polvo, Sudor Y Sangre" ("Dust, Sweat and Blood") 01:05	
 "Cid" 05:11	
 "¿Dias De Gloria...?" ("Days Of Glory...?") 06:01	
 "No Pidas Que Crea En Ti" ("Don't Ask Me To Believe In You") 05:06	
 "Cambaral" 06:07	
 "Aquí Estaré" ("Here I'll Be") 05:27	
 "Llanto De Un Héroe" ("Cry Of A Hero") 05:04

Credits 
 Víctor García - lead vocals, backing vocals
 Alberto Rionda - lead guitar, keyboards
 Rodrigo García - rhythm guitar
 Francisco Fidalgo - bass
 Alberto Ardines - drums

Collaborations 
 Fernando Arias - percussions
 Xuacu Amieva - flutes

Production 
 Raul Alonso - box cover art
 Ricardo Menéndez - graphic design
 Panci Calvo - photography
 Tim Young - mastering

Avalanch albums
1999 albums